Hall Primary School was a rural primary school on the northern outskirts of Canberra in the Australian Capital Territory. It was Canberra's oldest continually operating school, having opened in 1911, until its closure was announced on 13 December 2006, by the Education Minister, Andrew Barr as foreshadowed in the 2006-07 Australian Capital Territory budget.

Integrated into the school is the Laurie Copping Museum that recreates a school room from 1911. It was opened by the Governor-General in 2005.

The school was originally established in New South Wales and was the responsibility of the New South Wales government until 1913 when the ACT was created. The Commonwealth Government still pays the cost of  interstate based Hall students by way of Commonwealth Grants Commission adjustments.

See also 
 Tharwa Primary School

References

External links 
 Hall Primary School
 Help Save the Hall Primary School!

Primary schools in the Australian Capital Territory
Public schools in the Australian Capital Territory
Defunct schools in the Australian Capital Territory
Educational institutions established in 1911
Educational institutions disestablished in 2006
1911 establishments in Australia